Bridge of Weir railway station was a railway station serving the village of Bridge of Weir, Renfrewshire, Scotland, originally as part of the Bridge of Weir Railway.

History
The station opened on 1 June 1864, however it was closed on 18 May 1868 during the construction of the Greenock and Ayrshire Railway. It reopened, now as part of the new extended line, on 23 December 1869. The station closed on 10 January 1983.

References

Notes

Sources 
 
 
 

Disused railway stations in Renfrewshire
Railway stations in Great Britain opened in 1864
Railway stations in Great Britain closed in 1983
Former Glasgow and South Western Railway stations